Bird People may apply to:

 Avian humanoids
 The Crow Nation, known in their language as Absaroka, or the Bird People
 Bird People (film), a 2014 French film
 The Bird People in China, a 1998 Japanese film

See also
 Birdman (disambiguation)
 Hawkman (disambiguation)
 Wingman (disambiguation)